Roger Reid (born April 28, 1967) is a Canadian politician who was elected in the 2019 Alberta general election to represent the electoral district of Livingstone-Macleod in the 30th Alberta Legislature. He is a member of the United Conservative Party.

Career

Before Entering Politics 
Prior to serving with the Legislative Assembly, he owned and operated multiple franchise businesses in Claresholm and Nanton for close to a decade. Previous to this, he worked in the marketing/communications and graphic design fields.

Reid served as chair of the Claresholm and District Health Foundation from 2015 to 2019, and he volunteered with an electoral district association from 2015 to 2019.

Electoral History

References

United Conservative Party MLAs
Living people
21st-century Canadian politicians
1967 births